CKKI-FM (89.9 KiC Country Montreal) is a Canadian radio station in the Kahnawake Mohawk Territory, near Montreal, Quebec, which operates at 89.9 MHz FM. The station airs a country music format. Its on-air studios are located on Route 207, with production studios in Mercier.

In December 2009, the station originally operated as an unlicensed station on 106.7 FM, the frequency previously used by a local Aboriginal Voices repeater. It was granted a license to operate on 89.9 FM on September 29, 2011, by the Canadian Radio-television and Telecommunications Commission (CRTC). The station was licensed by the CRTC as a dual-language English / Mohawk station on the Sovereign Territory of Kahnawake, with 126 hours of local programming—120 hours featuring country music, and 6 hours of spoken word and talk programming, 5% in Mohawk, with the remainder in English.

On the weekend, Casey Clark's Country Countdown Ted Rupe's Country Spotlight, "Down East Country" with George Canyon , "Trucker Radio" and Cool Indy Radio are featured.

Currently during the week Kic Country is airing all music with no live programming, until the weekend.

References

External links
 
 

KKI
KKI
KKI
KKI
Former pirate radio stations
Mohawk culture
Pirate radio stations in Canada
Radio stations established in 2009
2009 establishments in Quebec